

Events

Pre-1600
1194 – King Richard I of England gives Portsmouth its first Royal Charter.
1230 – William de Braose is hanged by Prince Llywelyn the Great.
1536 – Anne Boleyn, Queen of England, is arrested and imprisoned on charges of adultery, incest, treason and witchcraft.
1559 – John Knox returns from exile to Scotland to become the leader of the nascent Scottish Reformation.
1568 – Mary, Queen of Scots, escapes from Loch Leven Castle.

1601–1900
1611 – The King James Version of the Bible is published for the first time in London, England, by printer Robert Barker.
1625 – Afonso Mendes, appointed by Pope Gregory XV as Latin Patriarch of Ethiopia, arrives at Beilul from Goa.
1670 – King Charles II of England grants a permanent charter to the Hudson's Bay Company to open up the fur trade in North America.
1808 – Outbreak of the Peninsular War: The people of Madrid rise up in rebellion against French occupation. Francisco de Goya later memorializes this event in his painting The Second of May 1808.
1812 – The Siege of Cuautla during the Mexican War of Independence ends with both sides claiming victory after Mexican rebels under José María Morelos y Pavón abandon the city after 72 days under siege by royalist Spanish troops under Félix María Calleja.
1863 – American Civil War: Stonewall Jackson is wounded by friendly fire while returning to camp after reconnoitering during the Battle of Chancellorsville. He succumbs to pneumonia eight days later.
1866 – Peruvian defenders fight off the Spanish fleet at the Battle of Callao.
1876 – The April Uprising breaks out in Ottoman Bulgaria.
1885 – Cree and Assiniboine warriors win the Battle of Cut Knife, their largest victory over Canadian forces during the North-West Rebellion.
1889 – Menelik II, Emperor of Ethiopia, signs the Treaty of Wuchale, giving Italy control over Eritrea.

1901–present
1906 – Closing ceremony of the Intercalated Games in Athens, Greece.
1920 – The first game of the Negro National League baseball is played in Indianapolis.
1933 – Germany's independent labor unions are replaced by the German Labour Front.
1941 – Following the coup d'état against Iraq Crown Prince 'Abd al-Ilah earlier that year, the United Kingdom launches the Anglo-Iraqi War to restore him to power.
1945 – World War II: The Soviet Union announces the fall of Berlin.
  1945   – World War II: The surrender of Caserta comes into effect, by which German troops in Italy cease fighting.
  1945   – World War II: The US 82nd Airborne Division liberates Wöbbelin concentration camp finding 1000 dead prisoners, most of whom starved to death.
  1945   – World War II: A death march from Dachau to the Austrian border is halted by the segregated, all-Nisei 522nd Field Artillery Battalion of the U.S. Army in southern Bavaria, saving several hundred prisoners.
1952 – A De Havilland Comet makes the first jetliner flight with fare-paying passengers, from London to Johannesburg.
1963 – Berthold Seliger launches a rocket with three stages and a maximum flight altitude of more than  near Cuxhaven. It is the only sounding rocket developed in Germany.
1964 – Vietnam War: An explosion sinks the American aircraft carrier USNS Card while it is docked at Saigon. Two Viet Cong combat swimmers had placed explosives on the ship's hull. She is raised and returned to service less than seven months later.
  1964   – First ascent of Shishapangma, the fourteenth highest mountain in the world and the lowest of the Eight-thousanders.
1969 – The British ocean liner Queen Elizabeth 2 departs on her maiden voyage to New York City.
1970 – ALM Flight 980 ditches in the Caribbean Sea near Saint Croix, killing 23.
1972 – In the early morning hours a fire breaks out at the Sunshine Mine located between Kellogg and Wallace, Idaho, killing 91 workers.
1982 – Falklands War: The British nuclear submarine  sinks the Argentine cruiser ARA General Belgrano.
1986 – Chernobyl disaster: The City of Chernobyl is evacuated six days after the disaster.
1989 – Cold War: Hungary begins dismantling its border fence with Austria, which allows a number of East Germans to defect.
1995 – During the Croatian War of Independence, the Army of the Republic of Serb Krajina fires cluster bombs at Zagreb, killing seven and wounding over 175 civilians.
1998 – The European Central Bank is founded in Brussels in order to define and execute the European Union's monetary policy.
1999 – Panamanian general election, 1999: Mireya Moscoso becomes the first woman to be elected President of Panama.
2000 – President Bill Clinton announces that accurate GPS access would no longer be restricted to the United States military.
2004 – The Yelwa massacre concludes. It began on 4 February 2004 when armed Muslims killed 78 Christians at Yelwa. In response, about 630 Muslims were killed by Christians on May 2nd.
2008 – Cyclone Nargis makes landfall in Burma killing over 138,000 people and leaving millions of people homeless.
  2008   – Chaitén Volcano begins erupting in Chile, forcing the evacuation of more than 4,500 people.
2011 – Osama bin Laden, the suspected mastermind behind the September 11 attacks and the FBI's most wanted man, is killed by the United States special forces in Abbottabad, Pakistan.
  2011   – An E. coli outbreak strikes Europe, mostly in Germany, leaving more than 30 people dead and many others are taken ill.
2012 – A pastel version of The Scream, by Norwegian painter Edvard Munch, sells for $120 million in a New York City auction, setting a new world record for a work of art at auction.
2014 – Two mudslides in Badakhshan, Afghanistan, leave up to 2,500 people missing.

Births

Pre-1600
1360 – Yongle Emperor of China (d. 1424)
1402 – Eleanor of Aragon, Queen of Portugal (d. 1445)
1451 – René II, Duke of Lorraine (d. 1508)
1458 – Eleanor of Viseu (d. 1525)
1476 – Charles I, Duke of Münsterberg-Oels, Count of Kladsko, Governor of Bohemia and Silesia (d. 1536)
1533 – Philip II, Duke of Brunswick-Grubenhagen (d. 1596)
1551 – William Camden, English historian and topographer (d. 1623)
1567 – Sebald de Weert, Dutch captain, vice-admiral of the Dutch East India Company (d. 1603)
1579 – Tokugawa Hidetada, Japanese shōgun (d. 1632)

1601–1900
1601 – Athanasius Kircher, German priest and scholar (d. 1680)
1660 – Alessandro Scarlatti, Italian composer (d. 1725)
1695 – Giovanni Niccolò Servandoni, Italian-French painter and architect (d. 1766)
1702 – Friedrich Christoph Oetinger, German theologian and theosopher (d. 1782)
1707 – Jean-Baptiste Barrière, French cellist and composer (d. 1747)
1729 – Catherine the Great of Russia (d. 1796)
1737 – William Petty, 2nd Earl of Shelburne, Irish-English politician, Prime Minister of the United Kingdom (d. 1805)
1740 – Elias Boudinot, American lawyer and politician, 10th President of the Continental Congress (d. 1821)
1750 – John André, English soldier and spy (d. 1780)
1752 – Ludwig August Lebrun, German oboe player and composer (d. 1790)
1754 – Vicente Martín y Soler, Spanish composer (d. 1806)
1772 – Novalis, German author and poet (d. 1801)
1773 – Henrik Steffens, Norwegian philosopher and poet (d. 1845)
1797 – Abraham Pineo Gesner, Canadian physician and geologist (d. 1864)
1802 – Heinrich Gustav Magnus, German chemist and physicist (d. 1870)
1806 – Catherine Labouré, French nun and saint (d. 1876)
1810 – Hans Christian Lumbye, Danish composer and conductor (d. 1874)
1813 – Caroline Leigh Gascoigne, English novelist and poet (d. 1883)
1815 – William Buell Richards, Canadian lawyer and judge, 1st Chief Justice of Canada (d. 1889)
1822 – Jane Miller Thengberg, Scottish-Swedish governess and educator (d. 1902)
1828 – Désiré Charnay, French archaeologist and photographer (d. 1915)
1830 – Otto Staudinger, German entomologist and author (d. 1900)
1844 – Elijah McCoy, Canadian-American engineer (d. 1929)
1859 – Jerome K. Jerome, English author and playwright (d. 1927)
1860 – John Scott Haldane, Scottish physiologist, physician, and academic (d. 1936)
  1860   – Theodor Herzl, Austro-Hungarian Zionist philosopher, journalist and author (d. 1904)
1865 – Clyde Fitch, American playwright (d. 1909)
1867 – Giuseppe Morello, Italian-American mobster (d. 1930)
1872 –  Ichiyō Higuchi, Japanese writer (d. 1896)
1873 – Jurgis Baltrušaitis, Lithuanian poet, critic, and translator (d. 1944)
1879 – James F. Byrnes, American stenographer and politician, 49th United States Secretary of State (d. 1972)
1880 – Bill Horr, American football player, discus thrower, and coach (d. 1955)
1881 – Harry J. Capehart, American lawyer, politician, and businessperson (d. 1955)
1882 – Isabel González, Puerto Rican activist who helped pave the way for Puerto Ricans' American citizenship (d. 1971)
1885 – Hedda Hopper, American actress and gossip columnist (d. 1966)
1886 – Gottfried Benn, German author and poet (d. 1956)
1887 – Vernon Castle, English-American dancer (d. 1918)
  1887   – Eddie Collins, American baseball player and manager (d. 1951)
1889 – Ki Hajar Dewantara, Indonesian philosopher, academic, and politician (d. 1959)
1890 – E. E. Smith, American engineer and author (d. 1965)
1892 – Manfred von Richthofen, German captain and pilot (d. 1918)
1894 – Norma Talmadge, American actress of the silent era (d. 1957)
  1894   – Joseph Henry Woodger, English biologist, philosopher, and academic (d. 1981)
1895 – Lorenz Hart, American playwright and lyricist (d. 1943)
1897 – John Frederick Coots, American songwriter (d. 1985)
1898 – Henry Hall, English bandleader, composer, and actor (d. 1989)

1901–present
1901 – Bob Wyatt, English cricketer (d. 1995)
  1901   – Edouard Zeckendorf, Belgian doctor, army officer and mathematician (d. 1983)
  1901   – Willi Bredel, German writer (d. 1964)
1902 – Brian Aherne, English actor (d. 1986)
  1902   – Werner Finck, German Kabarett comedian, actor and author (d. 1978)
1903 – Benjamin Spock, American rower, pediatrician, and author (d. 1998)
1905 – Alan Rawsthorne, British composer (d. 1971)
  1905   – Charlotte Armstrong, American author (d. 1969)
1906 – Philippe Halsman, Latvian-American photographer (d. 1979)
1907 – Pinky Lee, American comedian and television host (d. 1993)
1908 – Frank Rowlett, American cryptologist (d. 1998)
1909 – Teddy Stauffer, Swiss bandleader, musician, and actor (d. 1991)
1910 – Alexander Bonnyman, Jr., American lieutenant, Medal of Honor recipient (d. 1943)
  1910   – Edmund Bacon, American urban planner, architect, educator, and author (d. 2005)
1912 – Axel Springer, German journalist and publisher, founded Axel Springer AG (d. 1985)
  1912   – Karl Adam, German rowing coach (d. 1976)
  1912   – Marten Toonder, Dutch comic strip creator (d. 2005)
  1912   – Nigel Patrick, English actor and director (d. 1981)
1913 – Pietro Frua, Italian coachbuilder and car designer (d. 1983)
  1913   – Aydın Sayılı, Turkish historian and academic (d. 1993)
1915 – Doris Fisher, American singer-songwriter (d. 2003)
  1915   – Peggy Mount, English actress (d. 2001)
1917 – Albert Castelyns, Belgian water polo player and bobsledder (d. ?)
  1917   – Văn Tiến Dũng, Vietnamese general and politician, 6th Minister of Defence for Vietnam (d. 2002)
1920 – Jean-Marie Auberson, Swiss violinist and conductor (d. 2004)
  1920   – Otto Buchsbaum, Austrian-Brazilian journalist and activist (d. 2000)
  1920   – Vasantrao Deshpande, Indian singer and sitar player (d. 1983)
  1920   – Guinn Smith, American pole vaulter, soldier, and pilot (d. 2004)
  1920   – Jacob Gilboa, Israeli composer (d. 2007)
1921 – B. B. Lal, Indian archaeologist (d. 2022)
  1921   – Satyajit Ray, Indian director, producer, and screenwriter (d. 1992)
1922 – Roscoe Lee Browne, American actor and director (d. 2007)
  1922   – A. M. Rosenthal, Canadian-born American journalist and author (d. 2006)
  1922   – Serge Reggiani, Italian-born French singer and actor (d. 2004)
1923 – Patrick Hillery, Irish physician and politician, 6th President of Ireland (d. 2008)
  1923   – Albert Nordengen, Norwegian banker and politician (d. 2004)
1924 – Jamal Abro, Pakistani lawyer and author (d. 2004)
  1924   – Theodore Bikel, Austrian-American singer-songwriter, guitarist, and actor (d. 2015)
  1924   – Arthur Clues, Australian rugby league player (d. 1998)
  1924   – Hugh Cortazzi, English soldier, historian, and diplomat, British Ambassador to Japan (d. 2018)
1925 – John Neville, English-Canadian actor (d. 2011)
1926 – Gérard D. Levesque, Canadian lawyer and politician, 5th Deputy Premier of Quebec (d. 1993)
1927 – Ray Barrett, Australian actor and singer (d. 2009)
  1927   – Amos Kenan, Israeli columnist, painter, sculptor, playwright and novelist (d. 2009)
  1927   – Michael Broadbent, British wine critic and writer (d. 2020)
1928 – Hans Trass, Estonian ecologist and botanist (d. 2017)
  1928   – Georges-Arthur Goldschmidt, French writer and translator of German origin
  1928   – Horst Stein, German conductor (d. 2008)
1929 – Édouard Balladur, Turkish-French economist and politician, 162nd Prime Minister of France
  1929   – James Dillion, American discus thrower (d. 2010)
  1929   – Link Wray, American singer-songwriter and guitarist (d. 2005)
  1929   – Jigme Dorji Wangchuck, Druk Gyalpo of Bhutan (d. 1972)
1930 – Yoram Kaniuk, Israeli painter and critic (d. 2013)
  1930   – Marco Pannella, Italian journalist and politician (d. 2016)
1931 – Phil Bruns, American actor and stuntman (d. 2012)
  1931   – Martha Grimes, American author and poet
1932 – Maury Allen, American journalist, actor, and author (d. 2010)
1933 – Bunk Gardner, American musician
  1933   – Harry Woolf, Baron Woolf, English lawyer and judge, Lord Chief Justice of England and Wales
1934 – Manfred Durniok, German film producer, director and screenwriter (d. 2003)
1935 – Luis Suárez Miramontes, Spanish footballer and manager
  1935   – Faisal II of Iraq, the last King of Iraq (d.1958)
1936 – Norma Aleandro, Argentinian actress, director, and screenwriter
  1936   – Engelbert Humperdinck, English singer and pianist
  1936   – Michael Rabin, American violinist (d. 1972)
1937 – Klaus Enders, German motorcycle sidecar racer (d. 2019)
  1937   – Lorenzo Music, American actor, producer, and screenwriter (d. 2001)
  1937   – Gisela Elsner, German writer (d. 1992)
1938 – Moshoeshoe II of Lesotho (d. 1996)
1939 – Sumio Iijima, Japanese physicist and engineer
  1939   – Ernesto Castano, Italian football player
1940 – Jules Albert Wijdenbosch, Surinamese politician 
1941 – Tony Adamowicz, American race car driver (d. 2016)
  1941   – Bruce Cameron, Scottish bishop
  1941   – Clay Carroll, American baseball player
  1941   – Eddy Louiss, French jazz musician (d. 2015)
1942 – Jacques Rogge, Belgian businessman (d. 2021)
  1942   – Wojciech Pszoniak, Polish film and theater actor (d. 2020)
1943 – Mustafa Nadarević, Bosnian actor and film director (d. 2020)
1944 – Robert G. W. Anderson, English chemist, historian, and curator
1945 – Randy Cain, American soul singer (d. 2009)
  1945   – Judge Dread, English singer-songwriter (d. 1998)
  1945   – Bianca Jagger, Nicaraguan-American model, actress, and activist
  1945   – Goldy McJohn, Canadian keyboard player (d. 2017)
1946 – Peter L. Benson, American psychologist and academic (d. 2011)
  1946   – Lesley Gore, American singer-songwriter (d. 2015)
  1946   – David Suchet, English actor 
1947 – James Dyson, English businessman, founded the Dyson Company
  1947   – Lynda Myles, English screenwriter and producer
  1947   – Philippe Herreweghe, Belgian conductor
1948 – Larry Gatlin, American singer-songwriter, guitarist, and actor
1949 – Alan Titchmarsh, English gardener and author
  1949   – Alfons Schuhbeck, German celebrity chef, author and businessman
1950 – Simon Gaskell, English chemist and academic
  1950   – Duncan Gay, Australian businessman and politician
  1950   – Lou Gramm, American singer-songwriter
  1950   – Richard Ground, English lawyer and judge (d. 2014)
  1950   – Fausto Silva, Brazilian television presenter
1951 – John Glascock, English singer and bass player (d. 1979)
1952 – Chris Anderson, Australian rugby league player and coach
  1952   – Christine Baranski, American actress and singer
  1952   – Isla St Clair, Scottish singer and actress
1953 – Valery Gergiev, Russian conductor and director
  1953   – Jamaal Wilkes, American basketball player
1954 – Elliot Goldenthal, American composer and conductor
  1954   – Dawn Primarolo, English politician
  1954   – Stephen Venables, English mountaineer and author
1955 – Willie Miller, Scottish footballer
  1955   – Donatella Versace, Italian fashion designer
1956 – Régis Labeaume, Canadian businessman and politician, 41st Mayor of Quebec City
1958 – Yasushi Akimoto, Japanese songwriter and producer
  1958   – Stanislav Levý, Czech footballer and manager
  1958   – David O'Leary, English-Irish footballer and manager
1959 – Alan Best, Canadian animator, director, and producer
  1959   – Tony Wakeford, English singer-songwriter and guitarist 
1960 – Stephen Daldry, English director and producer
  1960   – Royce Simmons, Australian rugby league player and coach
1961 – Steve James, English snooker player
  1961   – Sophie Thibault, Canadian journalist
  1961   – Phil Vickery, English chef and author
1962 – Elizabeth Berridge, American actress
  1962   – Michael Grandage, English director and producer
  1962   – Jimmy White, English snooker player
1965 – Félix José, Dominican-American baseball player
1966 – Uwe Freiler, German footballer
  1966   – Margus Kolga, Estonian diplomat
  1966   – Belinda Stronach, Canadian businesswoman, philanthropist, and politician
1967 – Bengt Åkerblom, Swedish ice hockey player (d. 1995)
  1967   – Mika Brzezinski, American journalist and author
  1967   – David Rocastle, English footballer (d. 2001)
1968 – Jeff Agoos, Swiss-American soccer player, manager, and sportscaster
  1968   – Julia Hartley-Brewer, English broadcaster and columnist
  1968   – Ziana Zain, Malaysian singer-songwriter and actress
1969 – Brian Lara, Trinidadian cricketer
1970 – Marco Walker, Swiss footballer and coach
1971 – Musashimaru Kōyō, Samoan-American sumo wrestler, the 67th Yokozuna
  1971   – Fatima Yusuf, Nigerian sprinter
1972 – Paul Adcock, English footballer
  1972   – Ahti Heinla, Estonian programmer and businessman, co-developed Skype
  1972   – Dwayne Johnson, American-Canadian wrestler, actor, and producer
1973 – Florian Henckel von Donnersmarck, German director and screenwriter
1974 – Horacio Carbonari, Argentinian footballer and manager
  1974   – Andy Johnson, English-Welsh footballer
  1974   – Janek Meet, Estonian footballer
1975 – David Beckham, English footballer, coach, and model
1975     – Joe Wilkinson, English comedian, actor and writer
1976 – Jeff Gutt, American singer-songwriter 
1977 – Brian Cardinal, American basketball player
  1977   – Jan Fitschen, German runner
  1977   – Luke Hudson, American baseball player
  1977   – Fredrik Malm, Swedish journalist and politician
  1977   – Jenna von Oÿ, American actress and singer
  1977   – Kalle Palander, Finnish skier
1978 – Melvin Ely, American basketball player
  1978   – Mike Weaver, Canadian ice hockey player
1979 – Jason Chimera, Canadian ice hockey player
  1979   – Ioannis Kanotidis, Greek footballer
  1979   – Defne Joy Foster, Turkish-American actress, presenter and VJ (d. 2011)
1980 – Tim Borowski, German footballer
  1980   – Pierre-Luc Gagnon, Canadian skateboarder
  1980   – Ellie Kemper, American actress, comedian and writer
  1980   – Zat Knight, English footballer
  1980   – Artūras Masiulis, Lithuanian basketball player
  1980   – Troy Murphy, American basketball player
  1980   – Lassaâd Ouertani, Tunisian footballer (d. 2013)
  1980   – Brad Richards, Canadian ice hockey player
  1980   – Vincent Tong, Canadian actor, singer, voice actor and director
1981 – Robert Buckley, American actor
  1981   – Chris Kirkland, English footballer
  1981   – Tiago Mendes, Portuguese footballer
  1981   – Matt Murray, English footballer
  1981   – Rina Satō, Japanese voice actress and singer
1982 – Timothy Benjamin, Welsh sprinter
  1982   – Johan Botha, South African cricketer
1983 – Alessandro Diamanti, Italian footballer
  1983   – Maynor Figueroa, Honduran footballer 
  1983   – Tina Maze, Slovenian skier
  1983   – Daniel Sordo, Spanish race car driver
  1983   – Ove Vanebo, Norwegian politician
1984 – Saulius Mikoliūnas, Lithuanian footballer
  1984   – Thabo Sefolosha, Swiss basketball player
1985 – Lily Allen, English singer-songwriter and actress
  1985   – Kyle Busch, American race car driver
  1985   – Ashley Harkleroad, American tennis player
  1985   – Sarah Hughes, American figure skater
1986 – Yasir Shah, Pakistani cricketer
1987 – Saara Aalto, Finnish singer and actress 
  1987   – Nana Kitade, Japanese singer-songwriter and actress 
  1987   – Pat McAfee, American football player
  1987   – Kris Russell, Canadian ice hockey player
  1987   – Justin Young, English singer and songwriter
1988 – Neftalí Feliz, Dominican baseball player
  1988   – Stephen Henderson, Irish footballer
1989 – Jeanette Pohlen, American basketball player
1990 – Kay Panabaker, American actress
1990 – Paul George, American basketball player
1991 – Jeong Jinwoon, South Korean actor and singer
1992 – Sunmi, South Korean singer
  1992   – María Teresa Torró Flor, Spanish tennis player
1993 – Owain Doull, Welsh track cyclist
  1993   – Isyana Sarasvati, Indonesian singer
  1993   – Huang Zitao, Chinese singer and rapper
1996 – Cherprang Areekul, Thai singer
  1996   – Julian Brandt, German footballer
  1996   – Schuyler Bailar, American swimmer
2015 – Princess Charlotte of Wales, British royal, and third in line to the British throne

Deaths

Pre-1600
1203 BCE – Merneptah, pharaoh of Egypt
373 CE – Athanasius of Alexandria, Egyptian bishop and saint (b. 298)
 649 – Marutha of Tikrit, Persian theologian  of the Syriac Orthodox Church (b. 565)
 821 – Liu Zong, general of the Tang Dynasty
 907 – Boris I of Bulgaria
1219 – Leo I, King of Armenia (b. 1150)
1230 – William de Braose, English son of Reginald de Braose (b. 1197)
1293 – Meir of Rothenburg, German rabbi (b. c.1215)
1300 – Blanche of Artois (b. 1248)
1450 – William de la Pole, 1st Duke of Suffolk, English admiral (b. 1396)
1519 – Leonardo da Vinci, Italian painter, sculptor, and architect (b. 1452)
1564 – Rodolfo Pio da Carpi, Italian cardinal (b. 1500)

1601–1900
1627 – Lodovico Grossi da Viadana, Italian composer and educator (b. 1560)
1667 – George Wither, English poet and author (b. 1588)
1683 – Stjepan Gradić, Croatian philosopher and mathematician (b. 1613)
1711 – Laurence Hyde, 1st Earl of Rochester, English politician, First Lord of the Treasury (b. 1641)
1799 – Juan Vicente de Güemes, 2nd Count of Revillagigedo (b. 1740)
1802 – Herman Willem Daendels, Dutch general and politician, Governor-General of the Dutch Gold Coast (b. 1762)
1810 – Henry Jerome de Salis, English priest (b. 1740)
1819 – Mary Moser, English painter and academic (b. 1744)
1857 – Alfred de Musset, French dramatist, poet, and novelist  (b. 1810)
1864 – Giacomo Meyerbeer, German composer and educator (b. 1791)
1866 – José Gálvez Egúsquiza, Peruvian politician (b. 1819)
1880 – Eberhard Anheuser, German-American businessman, co-founded Anheuser-Busch (b. 1805)
  1880   – Tom Wills, Australian cricketer, co-created Australian rules football (b. 1835)
1885 – Terézia Zakoucs, Hungarian-Slovene author (b. 1817)

1901–present
1915 – Clara Immerwahr, German chemist (b. 1870)
1918 – Jüri Vilms, Estonian lawyer and politician (b. 1889)
1925 – Antun Branko Šimić, Croatian and Bosnian-Herzegovinian poet (b. 1898)
  1925   – Johann Palisa, Austrian astronomer (b. 1848) 
1927 – Ernest Starling, English physiologist and academic (b. 1866)
1929 – Charalambos Tseroulis, Greek general and politician, Greek Minister for Military Affairs (b. 1879)
1940 – Ernest Joyce, English explorer (b. 1875)
1941 – Penelope Delta, Greek author (b. 1874)
1945 – Martin Bormann, German politician (b. 1900)
  1945   – Joe Corbett, American baseball player and journalist (b. 1875)
1946 – Bill Denny, Australian journalist, lawyer, politician, and decorated soldier (b. 1872)
1947 – Dorothea Binz, German SS officer (b. 1920)
1953 – Wallace Bryant, American archer (b. 1863)
1957 – Joseph McCarthy, American captain, lawyer, judge, and politician (b. 1908)
1963 – Ronald Barnes, 3rd Baron Gorell, English cricketer, peer, politician, poet, author and newspaper editor (b. 1884)
1964 – Nancy Astor, Viscountess Astor, American-English politician (b. 1879)
1969 – Franz von Papen, German general and politician, Chancellor of Germany (b. 1879)
1972 – J. Edgar Hoover, American 1st director of the Federal Bureau of Investigation (b. 1895)
1974 – James O. Richardson, American admiral (b. 1878)
1977 – Nicholas Magallanes, American principal dancer and charter member of the New York City Ballet (b. 1922)
1979 – Giulio Natta, Italian chemist and engineer, Nobel Prize laureate (b. 1903)
1980 – Clarrie Grimmett, New Zealand-Australian cricketer (b. 1891)
  1980   – George Pal, Hungarian-American animator and producer (b. 1908)
1983 – Norm Van Brocklin, American football player and coach (b. 1926)
1984 – Jack Barry, American game show host and producer, co-founded Barry & Enright Productions (b. 1918)
  1984   – Bob Clampett, American animator, director, and producer (b. 1913)
1985 – Attilio Bettega, Italian race car driver (b. 1951)
  1985   – Larry Clinton, American trumpet player and bandleader (b. 1909)
1986 – Sergio Cresto, American race car driver (b. 1956)
  1986   – Henri Toivonen, Finnish race car driver (b. 1956)
1989 – Veniamin Kaverin, Russian author (b. 1902)
  1989   – Giuseppe Siri, Italian cardinal (b. 1906)
1990 – David Rappaport, English-American actor (b. 1951)
1991 – Gauri Shankar Rai, Indian Politician(b.1924)
  1991   – Ronald McKie, Australian journalist and author (b. 1909)
1992 – Wilbur Mills, American lawyer and politician (b. 1909)
1993 – André Moynet, French race car driver, pilot, and politician (b. 1921)
1994 – Dorothy Marie Donnelly, American poet and author (b. 1903)
1995 – John Bunting, Australian public servant and diplomat,  (b. 1918)
  1995   – Michael Hordern, English actor (b. 1911)
1997 – John Eccles, Australian neurophysiologist and academic, Nobel Prize laureate (b. 1903)
  1997   – Paulo Freire, Brazilian philosopher and academic (b. 1921)
1998 – hide, Japanese singer-songwriter, guitarist, and producer (b. 1964)
  1998   – Justin Fashanu, English footballer (b. 1961)
1999 – Douglas Harkness, Canadian politician (b. 1903)
  1999   – Oliver Reed, English actor (b. 1938)
2000 – Sundar Popo, Indo-Trinidadian musician (b. 1943)
2002 – W. T. Tutte, English-Canadian mathematician and academic (b. 1917)
2005 – Wee Kim Wee, Singaporean journalist and politician, 4th President of Singapore (b. 1915)
2006 – Louis Rukeyser, American journalist and author (b. 1933)
2007 – Brad McGann, New Zealand director and screenwriter (b. 1964)
2008 – Beverlee McKinsey, American actress (b. 1940)
  2008   – Izold Pustõlnik, Ukrainian-Estonian astronomer and academic (b. 1938)
2009 – Marilyn French, American author and academic (b. 1929)
  2009   – Kiyoshiro Imawano, Japanese singer-songwriter, producer, and actor (b. 1951)
  2009   – Jack Kemp, American football player and politician, 9th United States Secretary of Housing and Urban Development (b. 1935)
2010 – Lynn Redgrave, English-American actress and singer (b. 1943)

2011 – Osama bin Laden, Saudi Arabian terrorist, founder of Al-Qaeda (b. 1957)
2012 – Fernando Lopes, Portuguese director and screenwriter (b. 1935)
  2012   – Zenaida Manfugás, Cuban-born American-naturalized pianist (b. 1932)
  2012   – Tufan Miñnullin, Russian playwright and politician (b. 1936)
  2012   – Endang Rahayu Sedyaningsih, Indonesian physician and politician, Indonesian Minister of Health (b. 1955)
  2012   – Akira Tonomura, Japanese physicist, author, and academic (b. 1942)
  2012   – Lourdes Valera, Venezuelan actress (b. 1963)
2013 – Ernie Field, English boxer (b. 1943)
  2013   – Jeff Hanneman, American guitarist and songwriter (b. 1964)
  2013   – Joseph P. McFadden, American bishop (b. 1947)
  2013   – Dvora Omer, Israeli author and educator (b. 1932)
  2013   – Ivan Turina, Croatian footballer (b. 1980)
  2013   – Charles Banks Wilson, American painter and illustrator (b. 1918)
2014 – Tomás Balduino, Brazilian bishop (b. 1922)
  2014   – Žarko Petan, Slovenian director, playwright, and screenwriter (b. 1929)
  2014   – Efrem Zimbalist, Jr., American actor (b. 1918)
2015 – Stuart Archer, English colonel and architect (b. 1915)
  2015   – Michael Blake, American author and screenwriter (b. 1945)
  2015   – Guy Carawan, American singer and musicologist (b. 1927)
  2015   – Maya Plisetskaya, Russian-Lithuanian ballerina, choreographer, actress, and director (b. 1925)
  2015   – Ruth Rendell, English author (b. 1930)
2016 – Afeni Shakur, American music businesswoman, activist, and Black Panther (b. 1947)
2020 – Arif Wazir, Pakistani politician, leader of the Pashtun Tahafuz Movement (b. 1982)
2021 – Marcel Stellman, Belgian record producer and lyricist (b. 1925)

Holidays and observances
 International Harry Potter Day
 Christian feast day:
Ahudemmeh (Syriac Orthodox Church).
 Athanasius of Alexandria (Western Christianity)
 Boris I of Bulgaria (Bulgarian Orthodox Church)
 Germanus of Normandy
 May 2 (Eastern Orthodox liturgics)
 The last day of the Festival of Ridván (Baháʼí Faith) (Note that this date is non-Gregorian and may change according to the March equinox, see List of observances set by the Baháʼí calendar)
 Anniversary of the Dos de Mayo Uprising (Community of Madrid, Spain)
 Birth Anniversary of Third Druk Gyalpo (Bhutan)
 Flag Day (Poland)
 Indonesia National Education Day
 Teachers' Day (Iran) (Note that this date is non-Gregorian and may change according to the March Equinox, see List of observances set by the Solar Hijri calendar)

References

External links

 BBC: On This Day
 
 Historical Events on May 2

Days of the year
May